Cheshmeh Sefid-e Rutavand (also Romanized as Cheshmeh Sefīd-e Rūtavand; also known as Cheshmeh Sefīd) is a village in Gowavar Rural District, Govar District, Gilan-e Gharb County, Kermanshah Province, Iran. At the 2006 census, its population was 46, in 9 families.

References 

Populated places in Gilan-e Gharb County